Mehbub Mondal is an Indian politician from West Bengal belonging to All India Trinamool Congress. He is a former member of the West Bengal Legislative Assembly.

Biography
Mondal was elected as a legislator of the West Bengal Legislative Assembly as an All India Forward Bloc candidate from Galsi in 2001. He was also elected from Galsi in 2006. He joined All India Trinamool Congress on 9 September 2016.

References

Living people
All India Forward Bloc politicians
Trinamool Congress politicians from West Bengal
People from Paschim Bardhaman district
West Bengal MLAs 2001–2006
West Bengal MLAs 2006–2011
Year of birth missing (living people)